William Wallace Denslow (May 5, 1856 – March 29, 1915), professionally W. W. Denslow, was an American illustrator and caricaturist remembered for his work in collaboration with author L. Frank Baum, especially his illustrations of The Wonderful Wizard of Oz. Denslow was an editorial cartoonist with a strong interest in politics, which has fueled political interpretations of The Wonderful Wizard of Oz.

Biography
Born in Philadelphia to a tobacco wholesaler, Denslow spent brief periods at the National Academy of Design and the Cooper Union in New York, but was largely self-educated and self-trained. In the 1880s, he traveled about the United States as an artist and newspaper reporter; he came to Chicago for the World's Columbian Exposition in 1893, and chose to stay. Denslow acquired his earliest reputation as a poster artist; he also designed books and bookplates, and was the first artist invited to work at the Roycroft Press.

Denslow may have met Baum at the Chicago Press Club, where both men were members. Besides The Wonderful Wizard of Oz, Denslow also illustrated Baum's books By the Candelabra's Glare, Father Goose: His Book, and Dot and Tot of Merryland.  Baum and Denslow held the copyrights to most of these works jointly.

After Denslow quarreled with Baum over royalty shares from the 1902 stage adaptation of The Wizard of Oz, for which Baum wrote the script and Denslow designed the sets and costumes, Baum determined not to work with him again. (As co-copyright-holder, Denslow demanded an equal share in royalties with Baum and composer Paul Tietjens.) Denslow illustrated an edition of traditional nursery rhymes titled Denslow's Mother Goose (1901), along with Denslow's Night Before Christmas (1902) and the 18-volume Denslow's Picture Books series (1903–04). He also used his copyright to the art of the Baum books to create newspaper comic strips featuring Father Goose and the Scarecrow and Tin Woodman during the first decade of the twentieth century. The strip, titled Denslow's Scarecrow and [the] Tin Man, was intended to promote a forthcoming sequel he was writing. The strip ran concurrently with Queer Visitors from the Marvelous Land of Oz. He also created the comic strip Billy Bounce, notable as one of the earliest comic strips in which the protagonist has some manner of super powers.

The royalties from the print and stage versions of The Wizard of Oz were sufficient to allow Denslow to purchase Bluck's Island, Bermuda, and crown himself King Denslow I.

Denslow wrote and illustrated a children's book called The Pearl and the Pumpkin.

Personal life

Denslow had three wives and three divorces in his lifetime. His first wife, Annie McCartney (née, Anna M. Lowe, 1856–1908) married him in 1882 and gave birth to his only child, a son, the following year. The couple were already separated, however, and Denslow never saw his son. They finally divorced in 1896, freeing her to marry the man she lived with for five months. That same day, February 20, 1896, Denslow married Anne Holden Denslow, the daughter of Martha Holden, writer.  The marriage did not last long either.  Anne filed for divorce in September 1903, alleging that he told her in June 1901 that he did not love her and henceforth declined to live with her. In less than a month she married a young artist, their friend, Lawrence Mazzanovich, and left with him for Paris. Denslow then married his third wife, Mrs. Frances G. Doolittle December 24. Frances left him in 1906 and they finally divorced in 1911. He changed his will in 1914, leaving his estate to a fourth woman.

Death
Denslow died on March 29, 1915, in the Knickerbocker Hospital, New York City of pneumonia following an alcoholic bender with $250 obtained from the sale of a cover to Life. The cover appeared on the July 1915 issue.

He was buried in Kensico Cemetery, in an unmarked grave. A cenotaph exists in Grove Street Cemetery, on the more elaborate family stone.

Legacy
In 2018, "The Lost Art of Oz" project was initiated to locate and catalogue the surviving original artwork John R. Neill, W. W. Denslow, Frank Kramer, Richard 'Dirk' Gringhuis and Dick Martin created to illustrate the Oz book series.

References

External links 

 
 
 Original W.W. Denslow artwork from The Wonderful Wizard of Oz on www.lostartofoz.com
 
 Hearn, Michael Patrick. “The Man Behind the Man Behind Oz: W.W. Denslow at 150” AIGA July 5, 2006.
 DHS Denslow Seahorse at www.dardhunter.com
 Denslow's Humpty Dumpty From the Collections at the Library of Congress
 Denslow's Mother Goose From the Collections at the Library of Congress
 Denslow's Three Bears From the Collections at the Library of Congress

1856 births
1915 deaths
American caricaturists
American cartoonists
American children's book illustrators
American comics artists
Artists from Philadelphia
Burials at Kensico Cemetery
National Academy of Design alumni
Oz (franchise)
Cooper Union alumni